Metcalfa is a genus of planthoppers in the Flatidae family and the tribe Nephesini.  Species are essentially North American in origin, but M. pruinosa has been introduced to Europe (including Britain).

Description
Usually, adults of Metcalfa are 5.5 to 8 mm in length and 2 to 3 mm in width at the widest point.

Species
 Metcalfa frigida  (Metcalf & Bruner, 1948) 
 Metcalfa persea  (Metcalf & Bruner, 1948) 
 Metcalfa pruinosa  (Say, 1830) 
 Metcalfa regularis  (Fowler, 1900) 
 Metcalfa siboney  (Metcalf & Bruner, 1948)

References

Flatidae
Auchenorrhyncha genera